Herringfleet Mill or Walker's Mill is a Grade II* listed smock mill at Herringfleet, Suffolk, England, Now in a bad state of repair with two of the 4 sails removed.

History

The mill was erected c1820 by millwright Robert Barnes of Great Yarmouth. It was disused in 1883 but later put back to work. The mill was worked by wind until 1956. Her owners, the Somerleyton Estate were keen to ensure that she was preserved. East Suffolk County Council agreed in principle that the mill should be preserved, and approached the Ministry of Works who agreed to pay half the cost of the restoration. Most of the rest of the money came from East Suffolk County Council and the Suffolk Preservation Society, with smaller amounts from other groups.

Restoration of the mill was undertaken by Thomas Smithdale & Sons, the Acle millwrights. The mill was officially opened on 25 July 1958 by Charles Howlett, who had been marshman at the mill for over forty years. Further restoration work was done in 1971 by Neville Martin, the Beccles millwright.

Description

Herringfleet Mill is an octagonal three-storey smock mill with a boat-shaped cap. Winding is by tailpole and winch, the last mill on the Broads. The four Common sails are carried on a cast-iron windshaft. The wooden brake sheel has 59 teeth. It drives a  cast-iron wallower with 47 cogs. The wallower is mounted on an  square upright shaft. At the bottom of the upright shaft a cast-iron bevel gear with 33 teeth drives a cast-iron pit wheel with 102 cogs. The pit wheel is carried on a cast-iron shaft  diameter. The mill could pump  of water per minute.

Marshmen
Jimmy Walker
Charles Howlett 1916-56

References for above

Public access

The mill is open on National Mills Day (second Sunday in May) and on occasional days in the summer and autumn.

Culture and media

Herringfleet windmill appears in the short film And now they rest released in 1938. Herringfleet Mill is featured in the opening scene of the 2014 film Mr Turner, standing in for a Dutch windmill.

References

External links
 Windmill World webpage on Herringfleet Mill.

Towers completed in 1820
Industrial buildings completed in 1820
Windmills in Suffolk
Waveney District
Grade II* listed buildings in Suffolk
Smock mills in England
Grade II* listed windmills
Museums in Suffolk
Mill museums in England
Octagonal buildings in the United Kingdom